is a Japanese motorcycle racer.

Career statistics

Grand Prix motorcycle racing

By season

Races by year
(key)

References

External links
 Profile on MotoGP.com

Japanese motorcycle racers
Living people
1984 births
250cc World Championship riders